Benjamin Boyet (born 8 August 1979 in Vienne, Isère) is a French rugby union footballer, currently playing in the top division of domestic French rugby, for Bayonne. His usual position is at fly-half and he has played for France.

Although he had never played for the national team before, Boyet was included in France's 2006 Six Nations Championship squad and was included as a reserve against Scotland at Murrayfield, which France lost 16 points to 20. He went on to debut off the bench in the following match (on 11 February) against Ireland at Stade de France in Saint-Denis, which France won 43 to 31. France went on to win the Six Nations Championship. His next appearance for France was against the All Blacks at Eden Park in Auckland on 2 June 2007. He played at fly-half and kicked two penalties. He was also yellow carded in the 51st minute during France's 42-11 loss.

References and notes

External links
Benjamin Boyet on sporting-heroes.net
Benjamin Boyet on the Six Nations website
Benjamin Boyet on the European Rugby Cup website
Benjamin Boyet on L'Équipe 

1979 births
Living people
Sportspeople from Vienne, Isère
French rugby union players
France international rugby union players
Rugby union fly-halves
CS Bourgoin-Jallieu players
Aviron Bayonnais players